Alfred Kobylański (10 September 1925 – 1 November 2009) was a Polish footballer who played as a forward.

Biography
Kobylański's first club was Flota Gdynia, who he is known to have played for in the youth sides. He played for Polonia Warsaw from 1951 until 1953 and was part of the team who won the Polish Cup in 1952 by beating main rivals Legia Warsaw in the final. In total for Polonia he made 26 appearances and scored 8 goals in the Ekstraklasa. In 1954 he spent a season at Polonia Bydgoszcz, making 11 appearances, before moving to Lechia Gdańsk the following season. He made his Lechia debut on 25 March 1955 in the 1-0 defeat against Polonia Bytom. In his first season with Lechia he was again in a Polish Cup final against Legia Warsaw, this time being on the wrong end of a 5-0 defeat. In the 1956 season he played 12 times and scored 4 goals as Lechia achieved their greatest achievement in their early history by finishing 3rd in the I liga. He left the club midway through the following season having scored a total of 11 goals in 44 games for the club.

Personal life
Kobylański's son is former Polish international and Olympic silver medalist Andrzej Kobylański, and his grandson is the footballer Martin Kobylański.

Honours
Polonia Warsaw
Polish Cup: 1952

References

1925 births
2009 deaths
Polonia Warsaw players
Polonia Bydgoszcz players
Lechia Gdańsk players
Polish footballers
Association football forwards